Choi Gwi-seung (also Choi Kui-Seung, born 13 May 1941) is a South Korean modern pentathlete. He competed at the 1964 Summer Olympics.

References

1941 births
Living people
South Korean male modern pentathletes
Olympic modern pentathletes of South Korea
Modern pentathletes at the 1964 Summer Olympics